Blümcke Knoll is a small steep-sided feature protruding through the ice of northern Adelaide Island, off the Antarctic Peninsula.

It was mapped from air photos taken by the Ronne Antarctic Research Expedition (1947–48) and the Falkland Islands and Dependencies Aerial Survey Expedition (1956–57), 

It was named by the UK Antarctic Place-Names Committee after Adolf Blümcke (1854–1914), a German glaciologist who was a professor in the Oberrealschule at Augsburg.

References 

Hills of Graham Land
Landforms of Adelaide Island